Chimera is a South Korean television series directed by Kim Do-hoon and written by Lee Jin-mae. Starring Park Hae-soo, Lee Hee-joon and Claudia Kim, the series tells the story of three leading characters who dig through secrets of the past 30 years to find a culprit named 'Chimera'. It aired every Saturday and Sunday at 22:30 on OCN from October 30 to December 19, 2021. (KST).

Synopsis
The title of the drama is borrowed from Greek mythology. Chimera is the name of a monster that has the head of a lion, the body of a goat, and the tail of a snake, and breathes fire through its mouth.

An explosion took place in the past. That explosion led to a serial murder case known as the Chimera case. 35 years later, a similar explosion takes place.

Cast

Main
 Park Hae-soo as Cha Jae-hwan, 35 years old, a perfectionist homicide detective
 Lee Hee-joon as Lee Joong-yeob, a surgeon
 Claudia Kim as Eugene Hathaway, a profiler from the FBI

Supporting

People around Cha Jae-Hwan
 Nam Gi-ae as Cha Eun-soo, 60 years old, Jae-hwan's mother
 Kang Shin-il as Han Joo-seok, 60 years old, head of the Violent Crimes division

Joongsan West Special investigation headquarters
 Woo Hyun as Bae Seung-gwan, 60 years old, Joongsan Police Chief
 Heo Jun-seok as Go Kwang-soo, 38 years old, head of the Special Investigation Headquarters
 Kwon Hyuk-hyun as Lee Geon-yeong, 29 years old 
 Representative of a powerful team of special investigations. A young detective who is best friends with Jae-hwan. He is jealous of Eugene, former FBI agent
 Yoon Ji-won as Jang Ha-na, 29 years old, an agent of the special investigation team. She is good at computers and works in an image analysis room
 Kim Ji-hoon as Jo Han-cheol, 42 years old, homicide detective
 Jung Young-ki as Im Pil-seong, 38 years old, homicide detective

Seo-ryun group
 Kim Gwi-sun as Lee Min-ki, 64 years old, Member of Parliament
 Kim Ho-jung as Lee Hwa-jeong, 58 years old, president of Seoryun Hospital
 Lee Ki-young as Seo Hyun-tae, 64 years old, Chairman of Seo-ryun Group

Others 
 Cha Joo-young as Kim Hyo-kyeong, 35 years old, an elite reporter belonging to the investigative reporting team of a broadcasting company
Lee Seung-hoon as Ham Yong-bok 
 A former detective who was involved in the Chimera investigation with Joo-joo and Seung-gwan, and now owns a beauty salon.
 Han Ji-wan as Ryu Sung-hee

Production
The series is produced by JS Pictures with Park Hae-soo, Kim Soo-hyun and Lee Hee-jun in the main roles. 

An assistant director (the offender) and producer were fired as a result. JC Pictures issued an apology to the victim (a writer) and the cast and crew.

Viewership

Note

References

External links
   

 Chimera at Daum 
 

OCN television dramas
Korean-language television shows
South Korean thriller television series
South Korean crime television series
Television series by JS Pictures
2021 South Korean television series debuts
2021 South Korean television series endings